Beal was a railroad station on the Atlantic and Pacific Railroad line between Needles, California and Topock, Arizona from 1889.  It was located 5 miles north on the railroad line to Needles from Mellen.

History
The bridge across the Colorado River constructed at Eastbridge station in 1883 was washed out or undermined by the spring flooding of the river in 1884, 1886 and 1888.  Finally they changed the railroad route southward to Beal then to Mellen, where from 1889 to May 1890 they built the Red Rock Bridge, a cantilever bridge, on rock foundations, unlike the previous site.  The section of track between where the line changed direction to the new bridge, to the station of Powell and the bridge and station at Eastbridge, was abandoned in 1890.

Current status
As of 2021, the site of Beal is abandoned, with no visible ruins.

References

External links
  Map of the 5th Operating Division of the Western Division, Atlantic & Pacific R.R., From Peach Springs to Needles. W.A. Drake, Acting Chief Engineer. Drawing No. J-2-902. from davidrumsey.com accessed July 20, 2015.  This map was one of a set of six hand-drawn maps made in 1882 on semi-transparent waxed linen with some color, illustrating the route Lewis Kingman surveyed from Albuquerque to Needles.  It was intended to be printed but never was, due possibly to the problems at the bridge at Eastbridge, shown on this map, from 1884 to 1890. 
   Map of the 6th Operating Division of the Western Division, Atlantic & Pacific R.R., From Needles to Mojave. Saml. M. Rowe, Resident Engineer. Drawing No. J-2-902, 1882 from davidrumsey.com accessed July 20, 2015.  This map was one of a set of six hand-drawn maps made in 1882 on semi-transparent waxed linen with some color, illustrating the route Lewis Kingman surveyed from Albuquerque to Needles.  It was intended to be printed but never was, due possibly to the problems at the bridge and station at Eastbridge which was abandoned in 1890, shown on this map that shows the change of route south along the west bank to Beal, and to that new bridge at Mellen and the abandoned station Powell that can be seen partially erased on the map.

Former settlements in San Bernardino County, California
Ghost towns in California
Lower Colorado River Valley
Mojave Desert